Simulcra is a 1990 computer game for the Amiga and Atari ST developed by Graftgold  published by MicroStyle. A 3D polygonal third-person shooter, the player controls an attack craft which can switch between ground-based and aerial attack modes, traversing a wireframe virtual environment.

See also
 Zarch

References

External links
 Simulcra at Lemon Amiga
 

1990 video games
Amiga games
Atari ST games
Graftgold games
MicroProse games
Single-player video games
Third-person shooters
Video games developed in the United Kingdom